= Francesca Inskipp =

British counselling teacher and author (1921–2021)

Francesca "Cesca" Inskipp (1921 – 24 July 2021) was a British counselling teacher and author.

She worked at the Centre for Studies in Counselling. She was described, with Brigid Proctor, as having "led the development of supervision thinking, training and reflection in Britain".

== Works ==
- Skills training for counselling, London; Thousand Oaks: Sage, 2004.
- Counselling: the trainer's handbook. Cambridge : National Extension College, 1993.
- Skills for Supervising and Being Supervised. Alexia, 1990 (with Brigid Proctor).
